Enclosed cremation cemetery is a term used by archaeologists to describe a type of cemetery found in north western Europe during the late Neolithic and early Bronze Age. They are similar to urnfield burial grounds in that they consist of a concentration of pits containing cremated remains which have usually also been placed into pottery vessels. However they are also surrounded by a circular or oval bank and outer ditch which gives them their name. The most famous example is Stonehenge which functioned as such a cemetery during its early use when it was a simple earthwork enclosure. They are interpreted as being variations on the ritual and funerary practice of enclosing significant sites of activity during the period, also exhibited by henges and stone circles.

External links
 English Heritage Monument Class Description

European archaeology
Cemeteries
Cremation